Thomas Patrick McKenna (October 1891 – 1974) was an Irish professional footballer who played as a left back in the Football League for Grimsby Town and Barrow. He later managed Merthyr Town.

Personal life 
McKenna served as a private in the Football Battalion of the Middlesex Regiment during the First World War.

Career statistics

References

1891 births
1974 deaths
Irish association footballers (before 1923)
Association football defenders
Shelbourne F.C. players
Burnley F.C. players
Barrow A.F.C. players
Grimsby Town F.C. players
Morecambe F.C. players
Kendal Town F.C. players
English Football League players
Colne F.C. players

British Army personnel of World War I
Middlesex Regiment soldiers
Sportspeople from County Offaly
Merthyr Town F.C. managers
People from Tullamore, County Offaly
English football managers
English Football League managers
Date of birth unknown
Date of death unknown
Place of death missing